Madla is a borough of the city of Stavanger which lies in the southwestern part of the large municipality of Stavanger in Rogaland county, Norway. It lies in the western part of the city, along the coast of the Hafrsfjorden. The  borough has a population (2017) of 21,130. The borough was added to the city of Stavanger in 1965 when the old municipality of Madla was merged into the city. 

The borough of Madla have several historical landmarks. During the Viking Age (790-1066 AD), the Battle of Hafrsfjord was fought in the fjord of Hafrsfjord around the year of 872. The violent conflict became one of the most significant battles in the history of Norway as Harald Fairhair was declared the first king of Norway as a result of the conflict.

There are three churches in the borough: Revheim Church, Madlamark Church, and Sunde Church.

Neighbourhoods
Although the borders of "neighbourhoods" do not correspond exactly to the borough borders, Madla roughly consists of the following neighbourhoods: Madlamark, Hafrsfjord, Kvernevik, and Sunde.

Politics
Madla borough is led by a municipal borough council. The council consists of 11 members, with the following party allegiances:

References

Boroughs and neighbourhoods of Stavanger